was a town located in Kitaakita District, Akita Prefecture, Japan.

In 2003, the town had an estimated population of 7,590 and a density of 24.74 persons per km². The total area was 306.77 km².

On June 20, 2005, Tashiro, along with the town of Hinai (also from Kitaakita District), was merged into the expanded city of Ōdate.

External links
 Ōdate official website 

Dissolved municipalities of Akita Prefecture
Ōdate